The Blue Eagle Gym is a gymnasium located in the main campus of the Ateneo de Manila University in Quezon City, Philippines. Unlike most gymnasiums, the basketball court is oriented perpendicular to the orientation of the building.

History
The indoor facility was built in 1949, three years before the Ateneo de Manila University moved from its Manila campus to its current main campus in Loyola Heights, Quezon City in 1952. At its inauguration in 1949, it was called the Ateneo de Manila Gymnasium or Ateneo Gym. From late 1960s to mid 1970s, it was officially known as the Loyola Center. It was in the year 2000 that it was renamed the Blue Eagle Gym.

According to historical records, the gym was constructed under the direction of Ateneo Rector William F. Masterson, S.J., to be an alternative venue to the Rizal Memorial Coliseum for the National Collegiate Athletic Association games.

It is frequently a venue for sporting events of the University Athletic Association of the Philippines and the National Collegiate Athletic Association (pre-1978). Ateneo's games, however, were played at the Rizal Memorial Coliseum to prevent any home-court advantage during the school's NCAA years.

It was also a venue for Philippine Basketball Association games in the league's early years. The Manila Metrostars of the defunct Metropolitan Basketball Association also used the Blue Eagle Gym as a temporary home court before moving to the Mail and More Arena in San Andres, Manila.

The Blue Eagle Gym played host to the sepak takraw tournament of the 1991 Southeast Asian Games. It was scheduled to be the venue for women's basketball in the 2005 Southeast Asian Games, but since the Basketball Association of the Philippines was suspended by FIBA, the gymnasium was not able to host the event.

The gymnasium is the home of the Ateneo Blue Eagles, Ateneo de Manila University's varsity teams. It was used also as a training venue for the 2015 U23 and SEA Games national women's volleyball teams managed by the Larong Volleyball sa Pilipinas, Inc. (LVPI), whose secretary general, Ricky Palou happened to be a former athletic director of the school.

In 2019, the gymnasium was renovated in time for UAAP's Season 82 basketball.

References

External links

Blue Eagle Gym
The Blue Eagle Gym flies again

Ateneo de Manila University
Sports venues in Quezon City
Educational structures in Metro Manila
Indoor arenas in the Philippines
Basketball venues in the Philippines
University sports venues in the Philippines